The Rag Sefid oil field is an oil field located in Khuzestan Province, approximately 6 km in nearest distance from the Persian Gulf, southwest Iran. It was discovered in 1964 and developed by National Iranian Oil Company and began production in 1966. The field is owned by state-owned National Iranian Oil Company (NIOC) and operated by National Iranian South Oil Company (NISOC).

On 29 October 2017, a blowout occurred in the offshore well 147 and burnt for 59 days before it was brought under control. Since it contains 54.16 tcf of natural gas (largest natural gas of the country after the Pazanan oil field), controlling this fire was considered a record. Two other fires affected the oil field in 1966 and 1975, and the intervention of American oil companies and 100 days had been necessary to contain those. The fire could have been contained more rapidly, but the challenge evolved around containing the gas that could have killed all living creatures in a large radius if released. Relief wells had to be drilled to engage in a bottom kill procedure.

See also

List of oil fields

References

Oil fields of Iran